Camptozygum is a genus of plant bugs in the family Miridae. There are at least two described species in Camptozygum.

Species
These two species belong to the genus Camptozygum:
 Camptozygum aequale (Villers, 1789)
 Camptozygum pumilio Reuter, 1902

References

Further reading

 
 
 

Articles created by Qbugbot
Mirini